The 2014 Centrobasket Championship for Women was held in the city of Monterrey, Mexico from June 22 to June 26, 2014.

Group stage

Group A

Group B

Final round

Classification 5-8

Semifinals

Final classification games

Seventh place game

Fifth place game

Third place game

Final

Awards

Final standings

References
FIBA Archive

Centrobasket Women
2014–15 in North American basketball
2014 in women's basketball
2014 in Mexican sports
International women's basketball competitions hosted by Mexico
2014 in Central American sport
2014 in Caribbean sport
June 2014 sports events in Mexico